The Gathering Light is the fourth studio album by progressive rock band Karnataka, released by Voiceprint on 15 February 2010 to favourable reviews. It was the band's first studio album in seven years, and featured only bassist Ian Jones from the previous lineup.

Track listing
 "The Calling" (Instrumental) (Jones)
 "State of Grace" (Instrumental) (Carrera/Jones)
 "Your World" (Carrera/Fury/Jones)
 "Moment in Time" (Fury/Jones)
 "Serpent and the Sea" (Fury/Jones)
 "Forsaken"
 "Forsaken" (Fury/Jones)
 "Glowing Embers" (Instrumental) (Jones)
 "Distant Echoes" (Fury/Jones)
 "Tide to Fall" (Fury/Jones)
 "The Gathering Light" (Carrera/Fury/Jones)

Personnel
 Gonzalo Carrera - keyboards, piano
 Lisa Fury - vocals, percussion
 Ian Harris - drums
 Ian Jones - bass, keybass, piano, percussion, bodhran, programming
 Enrico Pinna - electric and acoustic guitars

Additional personnel
 Troy Donockley - uillean pipes, whistles (4, 6, and 8)
 Hugh McDowell - cello (2, 6, 7, and 8)

String Quartet
 Bridget Davey - violin (4, 6, and 8)
 Jane Fenton - cello (4, 6, and 8)
 Philippe Honoré - violin (4, 6, and 8)
 Clive Howard - viola (4, 6, and 8)

References

External links
 

2010 albums
Karnataka (band) albums